Vasil Bozhinov (born 8 December 1996) is a Bulgarian footballer who currently plays as a midfielder for Bulgarian Second League club Spartak Pleven.

Career

Pirin Blagoevgrad 
On 28 May 2016 he made his debut for the team in the A Group in a match against Lokomotiv Plovdiv.

In August 2017, Bozhinov joined Septemvri Simitli.

Career statistics

Club

References

External links
 

Living people
1996 births
Bulgarian footballers
Association football midfielders
OFC Pirin Blagoevgrad players
FC Septemvri Simitli players
FC Pomorie players
PFC Belasitsa Petrich players
OFC Vihren Sandanski players
FC Tsarsko Selo Sofia players
FC Hebar Pazardzhik players
First Professional Football League (Bulgaria) players
People from Petrich
Sportspeople from Blagoevgrad Province